Songs I Love to Sing is a 1960 studio album by the American singer Brook Benton, arranged and conducted by Belford Hendricks and produced by Clyde Otis.

Track listing 
 "Moonlight in Vermont" (John Blackburn (songwriter), Karl Suessdorf) - 3:40
 "It's Been a Long, Long Time" (Sammy Cahn, Jule Styne) - 2:28
 "Lover, Come Back to Me" (Oscar Hammerstein II, Sigmund Romberg) - 3:07
 "If You Are But a Dream" (Nat Bonx, Jack Fulton, Moe Jaffe) - 3:10
 "Why Try to Change Me Now?" (Cy Coleman, Joseph McCarthy) - 2:57
 "September Song" (Maxwell Anderson, Kurt Weill) - 3:06
 "Oh! What It Seemed to Be" (Bennie Benjamin, Frankie Carle, George David Weiss) - 3:17
 "Baby Won't You Please Come Home" (Charles Warfield, Clarence Williams) - 2:57
 "They Can't Take That Away from Me" (George Gershwin, Ira Gershwin) - 2:57
 "I'll Be Around" (Alec Wilder) - 2:28
 "I Don't Know Enough About You" (Dave Barbour, Peggy Lee) - 4:29
 "Fools Rush In (Where Angels Fear to Tread)" (Rube Bloom, Johnny Mercer) - 2:25

Personnel 
 Brook Benton - vocals
 Belford Hendricks - arranger

References

1960 albums
Albums arranged by Belford Hendricks
Albums produced by Clyde Otis
Brook Benton albums
Mercury Records albums